Viking Fotballklubb is a Norwegian football club from the city of Stavanger. The club was founded in 1899. Viking have played in the top division since the league was established in 1937, except for the years 1966–67, 1987–88 and 2018. In total, Viking have played 68 seasons in the first tier and 5 seasons in the second tier of Norwegian football. No other clubs have played more seasons in the top flight. The club has never played lower than the second tier.

In the first years, Viking played predominantly friendly matches against local clubs. Starting around 1910, Viking played in regional leagues in Rogaland until 1937. Common opponents in these years were fellow Stavanger clubs FK Vidar, IL Brodd and Stavanger IF. Viking were the dominating team in the region during the 1930s. The 1937–38 season was the first national league season. However, the league was still split into several regional groups. The winner from each group would qualify for a knockout tournament at the end of the season to decide the champion. Viking qualified for this knockout tournament twice, in 1937–38 and 1947–48. In the 1948–49 season, the league was split into only two groups. The two group-winners would then play each other to decide the winner. Viking won the league for the first time in 1957–58, after beating Skeid 2–0 in the championship final. Viking also won the Norwegian cup twice during the 1950s. The 1963 season was the first regular league season with only one group. Viking struggled in the first seasons with the new league structure, and were relegated in 1965, but were promoted back two years later. The 1970s were the club's most successful period, winning the league five times, reaching the Norwegian cup final twice, winning it once, and participating in European competitions several times. Viking won the double in 1979. The success continued into the 1980s with another league title in 1982 and being runner-ups in the league in 1981 and 1984. But in 1986 Viking were relegated for the second time in the club's history, and in 1987 they suffered their worst league position of all time, finishing in 8th place in the second tier. The next season, Viking were promoted back to the top division, and won the cup the following season. In 1991, Viking won their last top division title.

Key

League table key
 Pos = Final position
 Pld = Matches played
 W = Games won
 D = Games drawn
 L = Games lost
 GF = Goals for
 GA = Goals against
 Pts = Points
 Att = Average home attendance

Position key
 W  = Winners
 RU = Runners-up
 SF = Semi-finals
 QF = Quarter-finals
 GS = Group stage
 R4 = Fourth round
 R3 = Third round
 R2 = Second round
 R1 = First round
 QR2 = Second qualifying round

Key to colours and symbols

Seasons

Regional league

National league

Notes

References
General

Specific

Seasons
 
Viking